Ali Hossain Mia (born 1936 or 1937) is a politician from Comilla District of Bangladesh. He was elected a member of parliament for Comilla-12 in the 1979 Bangladeshi general election.

Career 
Ali Hossain Mia was elected a member of parliament for constituency Comilla-12 as a Bangladesh Nationalist Party candidate in the 1979 Bangladeshi general election.

References 

Living people
Year of birth missing (living people)
Bangladesh Nationalist Party politicians
2nd Jatiya Sangsad members